Methylorubrum suomiense  is a facultatively methylotrophic and aerobic bacteria from the genus Methylorubrum which has been isolated from forest soil in Finland.

References

Further reading

External links 
Type strain of Methylobacterium suomiense at BacDive -  the Bacterial Diversity Metadatabase

Hyphomicrobiales
Bacteria described in 2002